Cadetes de San Martín is a 1937  Argentine film directed by Mario Soffici and written by José A. Saldías.
It stars Enrique Muiño and Elías Alippi.

Cast
Ángel Magaña
Enrique Muiño
Elías Alippi
Rosa Contreras
Héctor Calcaño
Orestes Caviglia
Héctor Coire
Rosita Contreras
Blanca del Prado
Matilde Rivera
Oscar Villa

References

External links

1937 films
1930s Spanish-language films
Argentine black-and-white films
Films directed by Mario Soffici
1930s Argentine films